Australians in Thailand are a population of over 20,000. Bangkok has the largest concentration of Australians. Thailand remains a popular tourist and transit destination, with over 830,000 Australians visiting the country in 2014 alone.

See also

 Thai Australians
 Australia–Thailand relations
 Little Australia

References

 
Thailand
Ethnic groups in Thailand